The 1920 SMU Mustangs football team was an American football team that represented Southern Methodist University (SMU) as a member of the Southwest Conference (SWC) during the 1920 college football season. In its fourth season under head coach J. Burton Rix, the team compiled an overall record of 3–5–2 record with a mark of 0–4–1 in conference play and outscored opponents by a total of 125 to 90. The team played its home games at Armstrong Field in Dallas.

Schedule

References

SMU
SMU Mustangs football seasons
SMU Mustangs football